Applejack is a strong  alcoholic drink produced from apples. Popular in the American colonial era, the drink's prevalence declined in the 19th and 20th centuries amid competition from other spirits. 

Applejack is used in several cocktails, including the Jack Rose. It is a type of fruit brandy.

History 
Apple brandy was first produced in colonial New Jersey in 1698 by William Laird, a Scottish immigrant who settled in Monmouth County. The drink was once known as Jersey Lightning. Laird's great-grandson, Robert Laird, who served in the Continental Army, incorporated Laird's Distillery in 1780, after previously operating a tavern. The oldest licensed applejack distillery in the United States, Laird & Company of Scobeyville, New Jersey, was until the 2000s the country's only remaining producer of applejack, and continues to dominate applejack production. 

Once popular in early America, applejack declined in popularity due to the rise of other spirits that were easier to manufacture on a commercial basis, including rum, bourbon, and whiskey in the 19th century and gin, vodka, and tequila in the 20th century. In 1920, with the beginning of the Prohibition era, Laird's ended the production of liquor and began producing apple juice. In 1931, John Evans Laird received permission to produce apple brandy for "medicinal purposes" and stockpiled its product until the repeal of Prohibition in 1933.

Applejack has been associated with four presidents of the United States: George Washington requested instructions for producing applejack from Robert Laird for the family's recipe for applejack; Abraham Lincoln served it during a brief stint as a tavern keeper in Springfield, Illinois; Franklin D. Roosevelt included applejack in the Manhattans he regularly consumed; and Lyndon B. Johnson gave a case of applejack to Soviet leader Alexei Kosygin in the 1967 Glassboro Summit Conference.
 
In the 2010s, a number of smaller craft distilleries began to produce applejack in places such as New Hampshire, Pennsylvania's Lehigh Valley, New York's Hudson Valley, Holland, Michigan, and most famously in Toronto. at Nickel 9 Distillery.

Production 

The name applejack derives from the traditional method of producing the drink, jacking, the process of freezing fermented cider and then removing the ice, increasing the alcohol content: Cider produced after the fall harvest was left outside during the winter. Periodically the frozen chunks of ice which had formed were removed, thus concentrating the unfrozen alcohol in the remaining liquid. An alternative method involved placing a cask of hard cider in snow, allowing ice to form on the inside of the cask as the contents began to freeze, and then tapping the cask and pouring off the still-liquid portion of the contents. Starting with the fermented juice, with an alcohol content of less than ten percent, the concentrated result can contain 25–40% alcohol. Because freeze distillation is a low-infrastructure method of production compared to evaporative distillation, and does not require the burning of firewood to create heat, hard cider and applejack were historically easier to produce, though more expensive than grain alcohol. 

The disadvantage of freeze distillation, also called fractional crystallization, is that the substances remaining after the removal of the water include not only ethanol, but also harmful methanol, esters, aldehydes, and fusel alcohols. In modern times, reducing methanol with the absorption of a molecular sieve is a practical method for production.

When commercial production began, applejack was also starting to be produced through evaporative distillation.
Modern commercially produced applejack is often no longer produced by jacking but rather by blending apple brandy and neutral grain spirits.

Comparison to calvados
Applejack is somewhat similar to calvados, an apple brandy from Normandy, France, to which it is often compared. However, calvados is made from cider apples, while applejack is made from apples such as Winesap.

See also 
 Cider
 Fractional freezing
 Ice beer

References 

Distilled ciders
American distilled drinks